Michael Kelly Norvell (born October 11, 1981) is an American college football coach who is currently head coach at Florida State. Norvell was previously the head coach at Memphis. He has coached at Arizona State, Pittsburgh, Tulsa, and Central Arkansas. He played wide receiver at the University of Central Arkansas from 2001 to 2005 and is the school's all-time receptions leader.

Playing career
Norvell attended the University of Central Arkansas (UCA) from 2001 to 2005 and played wide receiver. He set the school's all-time reception record with 213 pass receptions for 2,611 yards and 15 receiving touchdowns, 1 rushing touchdown, and 2 passing touchdowns during his career.

 During his senior season in 2005, Norvell was part of a UCA Bears team that won the Gulf South Conference championship, and made it to the quarterfinals of the NCAA Division II playoffs, finishing the season 11–3.

Coaching career

Memphis 
On December 4, 2015, Norvell was introduced as the 24th head football coach of the Memphis Tigers. The youngest FBS head coach in the nation at the time of his hiring (aged 34), Norvell had overseen one of the nation's most explosive offenses at Arizona State under Todd Graham. Like Justin Fuente, Norvell was a young, up-and-coming offensive coordinator who employed an up-tempo, pass-oriented spread offense and brought the high-octane system with him to Memphis. 
One of Norvell's first moves as head coach was to retain Darrell Dickey from Fuente's staff, naming him associate head coach/co-offensive coordinator and running backs coach. The University of Memphis signed Norvell to a five-year contract that paid him a base salary of $1.8 million for his first year that would increase slightly each passing year.

The Tigers finished with an 8–5 record in 2016. With Riley Ferguson taking over as the team's starting quarterback, Memphis began the Norvell era with a 35–17 victory over FCS opponent Southeast Missouri State on September 3. The next week, Norvell's team defeated Kansas by a margin of 43–7. In the season's third game, the Tigers obliterated Bowling Green by a whopping 77–3 behind Ferguson's six passing touchdowns and one rushing touchdown in the game's first half. On October 1, Ole Miss handed Memphis its first loss of the season in a 48–28 rout. Five days later, the Tigers defeated Temple by a score of 34–27. That was followed by a 24–14 victory over Tulane on October 14. Memphis lost its next two; dropping a 42–28 contest to #24 Navy and a 59–30 blowout to Tulsa. On November 5, the Tigers pounded SMU by an overwhelming 51–7. The next week, Norvell's Tigers lost a shootout to South Florida by a margin of 49–42. They closed the regular season with a 34–27 win over Cincinnati on November 18 and a 48–44 victory over #18 Houston in a shootout. The Tigers accepted a berth in the 2016 Boca Raton Bowl, a game they lost to Western Kentucky by a score of 51–31. In 13 starts in 2016, Riley Ferguson threw for 3,698 yards and broke Paxton Lynch's single-season record with 32 touchdown passes set the previous season. After the 2016 season, co-offensive coordinator Chip Long left the Tigers to take the same position on Brian Kelly's staff at Notre Dame. To replace Long, Darrell Dickey was named the team's sole offensive coordinator. On May 12, 2017, it was announced that the University of Memphis signed Norvell to a one-year contract extension though the 2021 season and gave his assistant coaches raises. Kicker Jake Elliott was selected in the fifth round with the 153rd overall pick in the 2017 NFL Draft by the Cincinnati Bengals.

Memphis went 10–3 in 2017. They started the season on August 31 with a 37–29 victory over Louisiana-Monroe. The Tigers were supposed to play UCF on September 9, but due to Hurricane Irma, the game, which originally had been moved up one day to September 8, was rescheduled for September 30. In order to reschedule the American Athletic Conference game, Memphis canceled their game with Georgia State, leaving the team with only 11 regular season games as opposed to the usual 12. On September 16, the Tigers picked up a 48–45 upset victory over #25 UCLA, marking only their second victory over a ranked opponent in 21 years. After a 44–31 victory over Football Championship Subdivision opponent Southern Illinois, Norvell's Tigers suffered their first loss of the season in the form of a 40–13 defeat in the rescheduled UCF game. On October 6, Memphis obliterated UConn by a margin of 70–31. That was followed by a 30–27 victory over #25 Navy, marking the first time the Tigers had ever defeated two ranked opponents in a single season in school history. Ranked #25 in the country in the AP Poll, the Tigers won their third consecutive contest with an exciting 42–38 win over Houston. A fourth straight win followed on October 27 with a 56–26 blowout victory over Tulane. Norvell's Tigers made it five in a row with a 41–14 victory over Tulsa. On November 18, the Tigers defeated SMU in a high-scoring 66–45 contest to clinch the American Athletic Conference's West Division and a berth in the 2017 American Athletic Conference Football Championship Game. Memphis finished off the regular season with a 70–13 beat down of East Carolina, recording their seventh consecutive victory. In the 2017 American Athletic Conference Football Championship Game, the Tigers lost a hard-fought 62–55 double overtime contest to UCF. Memphis accepted a berth in the 2017 Liberty Bowl on their home field, losing the game to Iowa State by a nail biting margin of 21–20. On December 5, 2017, Memphis signed Norvell to another contract extension, a five-year addition to his deal worth $13 million. The extension increased Norvell's annual pay to $2.6 million and made him the highest paid Group of 5 head coach in the country. Following the 2017 season, offensive coordinator Darrell Dickey left Norvell's staff to take the offensive coordinator position on newly hired head coach Jimbo Fisher's staff at Texas A&M. Kenny Dillingham was promoted from graduate assistant to replace Dickey.

After starting the 2018 season 4–4 overall and 1–3 in conference play, Memphis would win their last 4 games, including a 52–31 victory over Houston in the final week of the regular season to finish in a 3-way tie for first in the West with Houston and Tulane. After tiebreakers, Memphis was awarded with the West conference berth to the 2018 American Athletic Conference Football Championship Game, facing off against UCF again in Orlando. Despite having a 38–21 lead at the half, the Tigers would only manage to score 3 points in the second half and ended up losing 56–41. Memphis accepted a berth in the 2018 Birmingham Bowl, losing to Wake Forest 37–34 to finish the season 8–6.

The 2019 season was one of the best seasons in the program's history, as the Tigers went 11–1 in the regular season and clinched a spot in the 2019 American Athletic Conference Football Championship Game on December 7, the team's 3rd championship appearance in a row, this time they went up against Cincinnati, whom the Tigers defeated 34-24 the previous week to clinch home-field advantage for the championship game. After a back and forth battle between the two teams, Memphis quarterback Brady White would connect with Antonio Gibson for a go-ahead touchdown with 1:14 left in the 4th quarter to give Memphis a 29–24 victory over the Bearcats to win the conference championship. Since they were the highest ranked group of 5 team in the final CFP poll, they were awarded a new years' 6 bowl berth to the Cotton Bowl against Penn State. The next day, Norvell left Memphis to become the new head coach at Florida State.

Florida State 
On December 8, 2019, Florida State University formally announced Norvell as its head football coach. His contract is for $26.5 million over 6 years. On October 17, 2020, Norvell led the Seminoles to a win over North Carolina, becoming the first ACC coach to defeat a Top 20 opponent in their first year; the team finished with a record of 3–6 in Norvell's first season. However, Norvell tested positive for COVID-19 ahead of the rivalry game with The University of Miami, and was not the acting head coach. As such he finished the season with a 3–5 record as head coach.

In Norvell's second season with the Seminoles, the program started 0-4 for the first time in 45 years and suffered its first ever loss to an FCS program in a 20–17 defeat to Jacksonville State.

In his third season, Florida State started off strong with a 4-0 record and entered the rankings at #23. This included a 24-23 victory over the eventual SEC West champion LSU in the first edition of the Louisiana Kickoff in New Orleans. They lost 3 consecutive games to ACC Atlantic foes Wake Forest, NC State, and Clemson before handily defeating Georgia Tech, rival Miami, and Syracuse. They became bowl eligible for the first time since 2019 following their 45-3 defeat of arch-rival Miami, and reached #19 in the College Football Playoff rankings following their 38-3 defeat of Syracuse. Following a 49-17 home victory against Sun Belt Conference foe, Louisiana, FSU had jumped four ranked spots in the AP Poll to #16, a season high since Week 4 of the 2017 CFB season. The Seminoles notched their first victory over arch-rival Florida since 2017, and fans rushed the field in celebration. They finished in 2nd place in the ACC Atlantic, ahead of NC State and Wake Forest, which were 2 of the 3 teams they lost to (the other being Clemson); NC State and Wake Forest both had losses of their own after beating Florida State, and finished 4-4 and 3-5 in ACC play, respectively, allowing the 5-3 Seminoles to claim 2nd place in the division standings and get a better bowl bid. Florida State was invited to the Cheez-It Bowl, where they defeated Oklahoma by a score of 35-32. The Seminoles finished 10-3 and were ranked #11 in the final AP Poll and #10 in the final Coaches Poll, finishing as the highest-ranked ACC team in the country.

Florida State extended Mike Norvell in 2023 to a new contract averaging $8.05 million per year.

Personal life
Norvell is married to Maria Norvell (Chiolino), with whom he has a daughter.

Head coaching record

* Departed Memphis for Florida State before bowl game.

References

External links
 Florida State profile
 Memphis profile

1981 births
Living people
American football wide receivers
Arizona State Sun Devils football coaches
Central Arkansas Bears football coaches
Central Arkansas Bears football players
Florida State Seminoles football coaches
Memphis Tigers football coaches
Pittsburgh Panthers football coaches
Tulsa Golden Hurricane football coaches
People from Irving, Texas